Tomisato Dam  is a rockfill dam located in Hokkaido Prefecture in Japan. The dam is used for irrigation. The catchment area of the dam is 8.7 km2. The dam impounds about 21  ha of land when full and can store 2800 thousand cubic meters of water. The construction of the dam was started on 1969 and completed in 1987.

References

Dams in Hokkaido